Abbacy  may refer to:

 The office of an abbot
 Territorial abbacy, territory of the Catholic church
 Prince-abbacy, title for a cleric